Lindo Ivan Storti (December 5, 1906 – July 24, 1982) was an American professional baseball player who appeared in 216 games as a third baseman, second baseman and pinch hitter in Major League Baseball for the St. Louis Browns from  to .

Storti batted only .227 with 160 hits during a lively-ball era in the majors, amassing 34 doubles, 11 triples, nine home runs, and 75 career runs batted in.

However, Storti had a 19-year professional career (1927–1945), including 12 seasons in the top-level American Association and lengthy service with Milwaukee,  Minneapolis and Toledo.

He died in Ontario, California, aged 75.

References

External links

1906 births
1982 deaths
Baseball players from Santa Monica, California
Hollywood Stars players
Lubbock Hubbers players
Major League Baseball third basemen
Milwaukee Brewers (minor league) players
Minneapolis Millers (baseball) players
Muskogee Chiefs players
Oakland Oaks (baseball) players
Portland Beavers players
St. Louis Browns players
Syracuse Chiefs players
Toledo Mud Hens players
Tulsa Oilers (baseball) players
Wichita Falls Spudders players
Gardena High School alumni